The 2015 Players Championship was a golf tournament in Florida on the PGA Tour, held  at TPC Sawgrass in Ponte Vedra Beach, southeast of Jacksonville. It was the 42nd Players Championship.

Rickie Fowler won the tournament, beating Kevin Kisner and Sergio García in a playoff.

Trailing by five shots with six holes to play, Fowler played them at six-under-par, going birdie-par-birdie-eagle-birdie-birdie to force a playoff. After the three-hole aggregate playoff (holes 16–18) ended with Kisner and Fowler still tied, they returned to the 17th for sudden-death.

Defending champion Martin Kaymer finished twelve strokes back at even par, tied for 56th place.

Venue

Course layout

Field
The field consisted of 144 players meeting the following criteria:

1. Winners of PGA Tour events since last Players
Bae Sang-moon (2), Ángel Cabrera (2), Alex Čejka, Ben Crane (2), Jason Day (2,6,8,12), Matt Every (2,8), Jim Furyk (2,8), Bill Haas (2,8), James Hahn (2), Brian Harman (2), Pádraig Harrington, Charley Hoffman (2,8,12), J. B. Holmes (2,8,12), Billy Horschel (2,7,8), Dustin Johnson (2,6,8,12), Martin Kaymer (2,4,5,8), Chris Kirk (2,8), Brooks Koepka (8), Hunter Mahan (2,8), Ben Martin (2), Hideki Matsuyama (2,8,12), Rory McIlroy (2,4,6,8), Ryan Moore (2,8,12), Geoff Ogilvy (2), Patrick Reed (2,6,8,12), Justin Rose (2,4,8), Adam Scott (2,4,8), Brandt Snedeker (2,7,8), Jordan Spieth (2,4,8,12), Robert Streb (2), Kevin Streelman (2), Nick Taylor, Brendon Todd (2,8), Camilo Villegas (2), Jimmy Walker (2,8,12), Bubba Watson (2,4,6,8,12)
Tim Clark (2,5) did not play.

2. Top 125 from previous season's FedEx Cup points list
Robert Allenby, Aaron Baddeley, Ricky Barnes, Jonas Blixt, Jason Bohn, Steven Bowditch, Keegan Bradley (4,6,8), Scott Brown, Paul Casey (8), Kevin Chappell, K. J. Choi (5), Stewart Cink, Erik Compton, Brian Davis, Brendon de Jonge, Graham DeLaet, Luke Donald, Jason Dufner (4), Ernie Els (4), Harris English, Gonzalo Fernández-Castaño, Martin Flores, Rickie Fowler (8), Sergio García (8), Brice Garnett, Robert Garrigus, Retief Goosen, Luke Guthrie, Chesson Hadley, David Hearn, Russell Henley (8), Morgan Hoffmann, Charles Howell III, John Huh, Billy Hurley III, Ryo Ishikawa, Freddie Jacobson, Zach Johnson (8), Matt Jones, Jerry Kelly, Kevin Kisner, Russell Knox, Jason Kokrak, Matt Kuchar (5,6,8), Scott Langley, Danny Lee, Marc Leishman, Justin Leonard, Will MacKenzie, Graeme McDowell (4,8), William McGirt, George McNeill, Troy Merritt, Phil Mickelson (4,8), Bryce Molder, Kevin Na (8), Noh Seung-yul, Louis Oosthuizen (4,8), Jeff Overton, Ryan Palmer (8), Pat Perez, Carl Pettersson, Ian Poulter (6,8), Michael Putnam, Andrés Romero, Rory Sabbatini, Charl Schwartzel (4,8), John Senden, Webb Simpson (4,8), Vijay Singh, Scott Stallings, Brendan Steele, Shawn Stefani, Henrik Stenson (7,8), Steve Stricker, Chris Stroud, Brian Stuard, Daniel Summerhays, Andrew Svoboda, Michael Thompson, David Toms, Cameron Tringale, Bo Van Pelt, Jhonattan Vegas, Nick Watney, Boo Weekley, Lee Westwood (8), Tim Wilkinson, Gary Woodland
Stuart Appleby, Justin Hicks, and Kevin Stadler did not play.

3. Top 125 from current season - Medical Extension
Spencer Levin, Scott Piercy

4. Major champions from the past five years
Darren Clarke

5. Players Championship winners from the past five years
Tiger Woods (6)

6. WGC winners from the past three years

7. The Tour Championship winners from the past three years

8. Top 50 from the Official World Golf Ranking
Jamie Donaldson, Stephen Gallacher, Branden Grace, Thongchai Jaidee, Anirban Lahiri, Shane Lowry, Joost Luiten, Bernd Wiesberger, Danny Willett
Victor Dubuisson did not play.

9. Senior Players champion from prior year
Bernhard Langer

10. Web.com Tour money leader from prior season
Adam Hadwin

11. Money leader during the Web.com Tour Finals
Derek Fathauer

12. Top 10 current year FedEx Cup points leaders

13. Remaining positions and alternates filled through current year FedEx Cup standings
Daniel Berger, Sean O'Hair, Justin Thomas

Nationalities in the field

Round summaries

First round
Thursday, May 7, 2015

Second round
Friday, May 8, 2015

Third round
Saturday, May 9, 2015

Final round
Sunday, May 10, 2015

Scorecard
Final round

Cumulative tournament scores, relative to par
{|class="wikitable" span = 50 style="font-size:85%;
|-
|style="background: Red;" width=10|
|Eagle
|style="background: Pink;" width=10|
|Birdie
|style="background: PaleGreen;" width=10|
|Bogey
|style="background: Green;" width=10|
|Double bogey
|}
Source:

Playoff
The playoff was the first at The Players to use the three-hole aggregate format, adopted the prior year, which began at par-5 16th hole. After the three holes, Fowler and Kisner were tied, but García missed his birdie putt on 18 to continue and was eliminated. The same three holes were scheduled for sudden-death, but started at the par-3 17th, which both had birdied twice Sunday. Fowler birdied it again (his fifth on the 17th hole in six attempts for the week) to win the title.  The birdies were a first for the Players; its four previous playoffs, all sudden-death, had no under-par scoring.

 García just missed his birdie putt on 18 to continue; his one-handed tap-in did not drop and it was scored a bogey. 
Source:

Scorecard

Cumulative playoff scores, relative to par
{|class="wikitable" span = 50 style="font-size:85%;
|-
|style="background: Pink;" width=10|
|Birdie
|style="background: PaleGreen;" width=10|
|Bogey
|}
Source:

References

External links
The Players Championship website

2015
2015 in golf
2015 in American sports
2015 in sports in Florida
May 2015 sports events in the United States